Bhadauria also called Bhadoria, Bhadouria, Bhadauriya, Bhadoriya or Bhaduria are Rajputs of Chauhan clan. They were historically mainly concentrated in what are now the districts of Agra, Etawah, Bhind and Dholpur, which includes the states of Uttar Pradesh, Madhya Pradesh, and Rajasthan.

The chief of this clan was the ruler of Bhadawar state in Bhind district , Madhya Pradesh before the Partition of India in 1947. There is a big Fort in Ater near Bhind that was built by the Bhadawar kings . The majority of the Bhadaurias live in Madhya Pradesh , Rajasthan , Uttar Pradesh and Delhi.

During the decline of Mughal Empire, Raja Kalyan Singh Bhadauria obtained possession of Dholpur . Thus the boundaries of Bhadawar Estate extended up to Gwalior in the South, Dholpur in the West  and Etawah and parts of Mathura and Kanpur in the East.

References

2.  https://forebears.io/surnames/bhadoria

Rajput clans of Uttar Pradesh
Rajput clans of Madhya Pradesh
Rajput clans of Rajasthan